Battery LeRoy is a historic artillery battery located at James Island, Charleston, South Carolina. It was built in 1863, and designed to protect lower James Island. At the end of the war this battery mounted four guns. The earthen redoubt measures approximately 340 feet on its right face, 140 feet on the center face and 160 feet on the left face. It has a 15-foot-high parapet wall and a slightly higher powder magazine.

It was listed on the National Register of Historic Places in 1982.

References

Military facilities on the National Register of Historic Places in South Carolina
Military installations established in 1863
Buildings and structures in Charleston County, South Carolina
National Register of Historic Places in Charleston, South Carolina
American Civil War on the National Register of Historic Places